Danishmendji (died 1348) was Khan of the Chagatai Khanate from 1346 to 1348. He was the second Khan of the Chagatai ulus to be descended from Ögedei.

In 1346 he was raised to the Khanship by Amir Qazaghan, who was the leader of the Qara'unas and who recently had taken effective control of the ulus.  Two years later Qazaghan had him executed and replaced him with Bayan Quli, who was a member of the house of Chagatai Khan.

References

1348 deaths
Chagatai khans
14th-century monarchs in Asia
Year of birth unknown